Tsugeo Ozawa (born 6 February 1935) is a Japanese épée, foil and sabre fencer. He competed in five events at the 1960 Summer Olympics.

References

External links
 

1935 births
Living people
Japanese male épée fencers
Olympic fencers of Japan
Fencers at the 1960 Summer Olympics
Sportspeople from Tokyo
Japanese male foil fencers
Japanese male sabre fencers